The Ocean at the End of the Lane is a 2019 play based on the 2013 novel of the same name by Neil Gaiman and adapted for the stage by Joel Horwood.

Production history

National Theatre, London (2019–2020) 
The play made its world premiere in the Dorfman Theatre at the National Theatre, London with previews beginning on 3 December 2019 (opening night 11 December) running until 25 January 2020. The production is directed by Katy Rudd, set designed by Fly Davis, costume and puppet design by Samuel Wyer, movement direction by Steven Hoggett and composed by Jherek Bischoff

The production received 3 nominations at the 2020 Laurence Olivier Awards for Best New Play, Best Actress in a Supporting Role for Josie Walker and won the award for Best Lighting for Paule Constable.

West End (2021–2022) 
Following the success at the National, the production was announced to transfer to the Duke of York's Theatre in London's West End in autumn 2020, however due to the COVID-19 pandemic the transfer was postponed until 23 October 2021 and ran until 14 May 2022. Casting was announced on 13 September 2021.

UK and Ireland Tour (2022-2023) 
The production is due to tour the UK and Ireland beginning at The Lowry, Salford on 12 December 2022 before touring until September 2023. Casting was announced on 12 October 2022.

Cast and characters

Reception 
The play received five star reviews from The Telegraph, Sunday Times, WhatsOnStage, Gay Times and SFX Magazine.

Awards and nominations

Original London production

References

External links 

 Official website

2019 plays
Plays based on novels
Adaptations of works by Neil Gaiman
West End plays
Fantasy theatre